Gerzensee is a lake in Canton of Berne, Switzerland.

It gives the name to the village of Gerzensee.

External links

Lakes of Switzerland
Lakes of the canton of Bern
LGerzensee